Barton Springs Bridge is a bridge in Austin, Texas, United States.

References

External links

 Barton Springs Bridge at HistoricBridges.org
 Barton Springs Road Bridge Project

Bridges in Austin, Texas